The Blackwater Lightship is a 1999 novel written by Irish novelist Colm Tóibín. It was shortlisted for the Booker Prize.

Tóibín conceived the book while traveling in Spain and, as he did not have access to a typewriter, bought a pen and notebook, which prompted his return to writing in Longhand.

Plot summary

The story is set in Dublin and County Wexford and described from the viewpoint of Helen, a successful school principal living with her husband and two children in Ireland. She learns one day, that her brother Declan, who is homosexual, has been ill with AIDS for years, and refused to tell her until then. He asks her to deliver their mother and grandmother the news. This presents a challenge to Helen as she has had minimal contact with the two women due to deeply buried conflicts relating to Helen's past and her father's sudden death when she was a child.

As the three women meet again they are forced to overcome these struggles for Declan's sake. The novel follows the painful journey they must take in order to correct the misunderstanding that exists between them.

Reception
The Blackwater Lightship was shortlisted for the 1999 Booker Prize.

Shortly after this, whilst out endeavouring to purchase groceries in Dublin, Tóibín was pursued by drivers of cars. The car drivers flashed and honked the horn at him. Presently, one young man ceased his act of flashing and honking the horn at Tóibín. The young man emerged from his vehicle. He threw his arms aloft. He proceeded to utter "Yah! Yah!" at Tóibín. According to The New Yorker, this was an act of "saluting the Booker acknowledgment" by a fellow countryman.

Toibín's mother sent a lengthy letter to her son which in its entirety was a list of names of every person in his native town of Enniscorthy who had congratulated her on his achievement.

Film, TV or theatrical adaptations

The novel was made into a film and aired on CBS as a Hallmark Hall of Fame presentation. Angela Lansbury received an Emmy nomination for it in 2004. It also stars Gina McKee, Sam Robards, Dianne Wiest, and Keith McErlean; and was directed by John Erman.

References

External links
 CBS site for the film

1999 Irish novels
Novels with gay themes
Novels by Colm Tóibín
Novels about HIV/AIDS
Novels set in Dublin (city)
Irish novels adapted into films
Picador (imprint) books
Novels set in County Wexford
Irish LGBT novels
1990s LGBT novels
Irish novels adapted into television shows